Punta Mogotes is an open beach area and an adjacent neighbourhood located in Mar del Plata, Argentina, some  south-west of the city's port. The coastline was largely high dunes and a somewhat wild landscape until 1980, when a large compound of resort facilities and paved roads was built right along the beach.

References

Landforms of Buenos Aires Province
Tourist attractions in Mar del Plata
Beaches of Argentina